Mario Omar Méndez (born 11 May 1938) is a Uruguayan former footballer. He played in 23 matches for the Uruguay national football team from 1959 and 1968. He was also part of Uruguay's squad for the 1959 South American Championship that took place in Ecuador.

References

External links
 
 
 Profile at ASOCIACIÓN URUGUAYA DE FÚTBOL

1938 births
Living people
Uruguayan footballers
Uruguay international footballers
Place of birth missing (living people)
Association football defenders
Sud América players
Club Nacional de Football players
Peñarol players
Defensor Sporting players
Estudiantes de Mérida players
Uruguayan expatriate footballers
Expatriate footballers in Venezuela
1962 FIFA World Cup players